Pedro José Geraldes de Carvalho (born July 15, 1985) is a Portuguese actor.

Biography
Pedro Carvalho was born in Guarda, Portugal, but grew up in Fundão, where he lived until 17 when he moved to Lisbon to pursue a career as an actor. He finished the professional course of ACT - School of Actors for Cinema and Television in 2007 and since then he has worked in television, cinema and theater.

Filmography

Television

Film

Stage

References

External links
 
 slim power

1985 births
Living people
Portuguese gay actors
People from Guarda, Portugal
People from Fundão, Portugal
Portuguese male television actors
Portuguese male film actors
Portuguese male stage actors
Portuguese male voice actors
21st-century Portuguese male actors
Male actors from Lisbon
Portuguese twins